Pyrazolopyrimidines are a series of isomeric heterocyclic chemical compounds with the molecular formula C6H5N3.   They form the central core of a variety of more complex chemical compounds including some pharmaceuticals and pesticides.

Pharmaceuticals
One isomer of pyrazolopyrimidines, known as pyrazolo[1,5-a]pyrimidine, is the basis for a class of sedative and anxiolytic drugs related (in terms of their effect) to benzodiazepines.

Most of the drugs from this class marketed to date are intended to induce sleep, and are prescribed for people suffering insomnia, however some newer compounds produce anxiolytic effects with relatively little sedation, and are being developed for use as non-sedating anti-anxiety drugs.

They include:

 Zaleplon - hypnotic (trade name Sonata)
 Indiplon - hypnotic
 Ocinaplon - anxiolytic
 Lorediplon - hypnotic

As they are not chemically related to the benzodiazepines despite their similar effect, such drugs—as well as the imidazopyridines and cyclopyrrones—are sometimes grouped together and referred to as "nonbenzodiazepines".

Pesticides 
A related use is in pyrazolopyrimidine organothiophosphate pesticides including chlorprazophos (insecticide) and pyrazophos (fungicide, insecticide).

See also 
 Nonbenzodiazepine

References 

 
Chemical classes of psychoactive drugs